Christopher Brockbank (fourth ¼ 1901 – 24 July 1963) was an English professional rugby league footballer who played in the 1920s, and coached in the 1930s through to the 1950s.

Background
Chris Brockbank's birth was registered in Barton-upon-Irwell district, Lancashire, England, and he died aged 61 in Blackpool, Lancashire, England.

Playing career

International honours
Chris Brockbank won a cap for England while at Swinton in 1927 against Wales.

County Cup Final appearances
Chris Brockbank played , i.e. number 5, in Swinton's 0–17 defeat by St Helens Recs in the 1923–24 Lancashire County Cup Final during the 1923–24 season at Central Park, Wigan on Saturday 24 November 1923, in front of a crowd of 25,636,  played  and scored a try in the 15–11 victory over Wigan in the 1925–26 Lancashire County Cup Final during the 1925–26 season at The Cliff, Broughton, Salford on Wednesday 9 December 1925 (postponed from Saturday 21 November 1925 due to fog), in front of a crowd of 17,000, played  in the 5–2 victory over Wigan in the 1927–28 Lancashire County Cup Final during the 1927–28 season at Watersheddings, Oldham on Saturday 19 November 1927, in front of a crowd of 22,000, but he didn't play in the 8–10 defeat by Salford in the 1931–32 Lancashire County Cup Final during the 1931–32 season at The Cliff, Broughton, Salford on Saturday 21 November 1931, in front of a crowd of 26,471.

Coaching career

Challenge Cup Final appearances
Chris Brockbank was the coach in Huddersfield's 21–17 victory over Warrington in the 1932–33 Challenge Cup Final during the 1932–33 season at Wembley Stadium, London on Saturday 6 May 1933, was the coach in the 8-11 defeat by Castleford in the 1934–35 Challenge Cup Final during the 1934–35 season at Wembley Stadium, London on Saturday 4 May 1935, in front of a crowd of 39,000, and was the coach in Warrington's 19-0 victory over Widnes in the 1949–50 Challenge Cup Final during the 1949–50 season at Wembley Stadium, London on Saturday 6 May 1950, in front of a crowd of 94,249.

Genealogical information
Brockbank's marriage to Florence (née Jackson) was registered during third ¼ 1925 in Barton-upon-Irwell district.

Outside of rugby league
Chris Brockbank retired from rugby league in 1951 to run a hotel business in Blackpool.

References

External links

1901 births
1963 deaths
Bradford Bulls players
England national rugby league team players
English rugby league coaches
English rugby league players
Huddersfield Giants coaches
People from Eccles, Greater Manchester
Rugby league players from Salford
Rugby league wingers
Swinton Lions players
Warrington Wolves coaches